The Sri Lanka Army Medical Corps  (SLMC) (Sinhala: ශ්‍රී ලංකා යුද හමුදා වෛද්‍ය බලකාය Shri Lanka Yuddha Hamuda Vayidya Balakaya) is a specialist corps in the Sri Lanka Army which specializes in military medicine and provides medical services to all army personnel and their families in war and in peace. It is made up of 4 regular units and one volunteer unit. Headquartered in Colombo, formally at army headquarters. The corps Cap badge depicting the Rod of Asclepius. General officers and senior officers of the SLMC wear gorget patches of maroon rather than of scarlet worn by other officers of similar rank.

History 
The origins of the corps dates back to 29 July 1881 when stretcher beater company was raised as a part of the Ceylon Light Infantry Volunteers, which evolved into the Ceylon Volunteer Medical Corps (CVMC) of the Ceylon Defence Force serving in both world wars. With Ceylon gaining self rule in 1948 and the formation of the Ceylon Army in 1949, the CVMC became a part of the Ceylon Army Volunteer Force with Lt. Col. Sydney Jayawardene was the first Commanding Officer. In October 1950 the Ceylon Army Medical Corps (CAMC) was formed in the regular force of the Ceylon Army, with 3 medical officers, and 20 other ranks drawn from the wartime CVMC, under the command of Major H. C. Serasinghe. The CAMC established a10 bed Medical Reception Station (MRS) at the General Military Hospital, Colombo operated by the Royal Army Medical Corps, which was later upgraded to a 50 bed service hospital in 1952. In 1961 a MRS were setup at the Army Training Centre, Diyatalawa. The first Regiment, CAMC was formed in 1965 and the CVMC became the 2nd (Volunteer) Regiment, CAMC with its personal serving during the 1971 JVP insurrection. The corps was renamed once again in 1972 as the Sri Lanka Army Medical Corps when Sri Lanka became a republic. With the on set of the Sri Lankan Civil War military base hospitals were established at the Palaly Military Base and at the Panagoda Cantonment in 1985. The Directorate of Army Medical Service was established in 1985. In 1997, a military base hospital was established in Anuradhapura. With civil war intensifying in the 1980's and 1990's the SLMC was expanded and deployed support combat operations and the high number of casualties.

Hospitals 
Since all three armed forces and the police maintain their medical services with their own hospitals, the corp is only responsible for maintaining and operating army medical facilities mainly focused on treatment of battle casualties. Apart from medical reception stations in almost all military stations these include;

Military Hospitals
 Colombo Military Hospital, Colombo
 University Hospital Kotelawala Defence University Hospital, Werahera
 Victory Military Hospital, Anuradhapura

Base Hospitals in
Panagoda Cantonment
Diyatalawa Garrison
Palaly Military Base
Ampara Military Base

Units

Regular Army
1st Regiment, Sri Lanka Army Medical Corps (Regimental HQ SLAMC, Werahera)
3rd Regiment, Sri Lanka Army Medical Corps (Anuradhapura)
4th Regiment, Sri Lanka Army Medical Corps (Jaffna)
5th Regiment, Sri Lanka Army Medical Corps (Habarana)

Volunteers
2nd(V) Regiment, Sri Lanka Army Medical Corps (Panagoda Cantonment) (Formed on 29 July 1881)

Training Centres
 Sri Lanka Army Military School Of Nursing

Trades/Careers
Officer Careers:
Physician (Medical Officer)
Dentist (Dental Officer)
Physiotherapist (Medical Support Officer)

Soldier Trades:
Nurse
Clinical Physiologist
Medical laboratory technologist (MLT)
Pharmacist
Radiographer
Physiotherapist
 Dental Nurse
 Dental Hygienist
Combat Medical Technician
 Operating Department Practitioner
Pharmacy Assistant
Public Health Inspector

Notable members
 Sir Frank Gunasekera, CBE, ED - former Deputy President of the Senate of Ceylon and Commanding officer, Ceylon Medical Corps (1935-1939)
Major General Dr Chelliah Thurairaja, USP, MBBS - former Director Army Medical Services and Colonel Commandant of the SLAMC
Major General Dr Sanjeewa Munasinghe, RWP, RSP, VSV, USP -  Permanent Secretary of the Ministry of Health, Director General, Army Health Services, and Colonel Commandant of the SLAMC
 Brigadier Herbert Clifford Serasinghe, OBE, ED - former Commanding officer, Ceylon Army Medical Corps  
 Colonel Vincent Henry Ludovici Anthonisz, OBE, VD - former Commanding officer, Ceylon Medical Corps (1939-1946)
 Lieutenant Colonel Dr. Rex De Costa, MBE - former Commanding officer, Ruhunu Regiment and Vice President, World Veterans Federation
 Lieutenant Colonel Dr. John Rockwood, VD - former Commanding officer, Ceylon Medical Corps (1927-1931)
 Major General Dr Thusitha Janaka Liyanaarachchi - (SLAMC-O/60041) 1982-2018 former Director of Army Medical Procurement Services
 Brigadier Dr H. I. K. Fernando - ADC, MBBS, DA (London), Officer of the Order of St. John -Former Director Army Medical Services and All Ceylon cricket player
 Brigadier Dr R. T. Tambiah, VSV - Former Director Army Medical Services  
 Colonel Dr Anthony "Tony" Gabriel, MBBS, FRCS (Eng), FRCS (Edin), Hon. FDS(SL), Hon. FDSRCS (Eng) - former Commanding officer, 2nd(V) Sri Lanka Army Medical Corps, President of the College of Surgeons Sri Lanka and  Hon. Fellow British Association of Oral and Maxillofascial Surgeons.

Order of precedence

See also
 Sri Lanka Army

References

External links and sources
 Sri Lanka Army
 Sri Lanka Army Medical Corps
 Healing the patriotic wounds, Sunday Times
 http://slarmymedicalcorps.com/

Medical Corps
Medical Corps
Army medical administrative corps
Military medicine in Sri Lanka
Military units and formations of Ceylon in World War II
Military units and formations established in 1881